Onia (o-nee-ah; the Hebrew word for “ship”) is a New-York based clothing company that sells luxury swimwear and ready to wear. The company was founded in 2009 by Carl Cunow and Nathan Romano.

History
In 2013, Onia expanded its collection to include men’s casual wear. In 2015, Onia launched women's swim and ready to wear. In December 2015, Onia launched on Mr. Porter. In 2019 the brand moved into licensing acquiring the men's license for Body Glove.

Onia has been featured in The New York Times, The Wall Street Journal, Forbes, Women's Wear Daily, and men’s fashion publications such as GQ and Detail.

Onia swimwear has become increasingly popular in the summer of 2019 amongst celebrities such as Kylie Jenner and Jessica Alba.

In the Fall of 2022, Onia's new Air Linen Camp shirts line became popular and was endorsed by Esquire Magazine.

Collaborations
Onia has an ongoing collaboration with Liberty Art Fabrics, who supplies fabrics for much of Onia’s swimwear. Onia has also collaborated with Ritz-Carlton Hotel Company and other  resorts to create towels for resort guests.

Onia has entered into a multi-year licensing agreement with WeWoreWhat’s Danielle Bernstein. Their recent Italy collection sold nearly $2 million in swimwear within 12 Hours.

Onia runs third-party distribution among brands such as Club Monaco, Theory, Mr. Porter and Net-a-Porter. In 2019 they are launching wholesale distribution for WeWoreWhat as a standalone brand at Coterie.

References

Clothing companies based in New York City
2009 establishments in New York City